Bernardo Vieira Hees is a Brazilian economist and businessman. He held the position of chief executive officer (CEO) of The Kraft Heinz Company until stepping down on June 30, 2019. He previously served as CEO of The H.J. Heinz Company, Burger King Corporation, and America Latina Logistica, Latin America's largest railroad and logistics company. Hees is also a partner in the global investment firm 3G Capital.

He holds a BA in Economics from the Pontifical Catholic University of Rio de Janeiro, and an MBA from Warwick Business School in the United Kingdom.

References

Living people
Year of birth missing (living people)
Place of birth missing (living people)
Alumni of the University of Warwick
Brazilian chief executives
Pontifical Catholic University of Rio de Janeiro alumni
Kraft Heinz people